Per Walsøe is a Danish former Supreme Court judge and a retired male badminton player who won a number of Danish national and international doubles titles from the mid-1960s to the early 1970s.

Career
Walsoe won the gold medal at the 1970 European Badminton Championships in men's doubles with Elo Hansen. He also captured the mixed doubles crown at the prestigious All-England Championships with Pernille Molgaard Hansen in 1970, having previously reached the final with the same partner in 1966 and 1967. Walsoe was also a runner-up with Svend Andersen (Pri) in the 1967 All-England men's doubles  to fellow Danes Erland Kops and Henning Borch. One of the physically largest men to have played world class badminton, Walsoe represented Denmark in Thomas Cup (world men's team) competition in the '66-'67, '69-'70, and '75-'76 seasons.

Achievements
Men's doubles

References 

Danish male badminton players
Living people
1943 births
Supreme Court (Denmark) justices